Victorian fashion consists of the various fashions and trends in British culture that emerged and developed in the United Kingdom and the British Empire throughout the Victorian era, roughly from the 1830s through the 1890s. The period saw many changes in fashion, including changes in styles, fashion technology and the methods of distribution. Various movement in architecture, literature, and the decorative and visual arts as well as a changing perception of gender roles also influenced fashion.

Under Queen Victoria's reign, England enjoyed a period of growth along with technological advancement. Mass production of sewing machines in the 1850s as well as the advent of synthetic dyes introduced major changes in fashion. Clothing could be made more quickly and cheaply. Advancement in printing and proliferation of fashion magazines allowed the masses to participate in the evolving trends of high fashion, opening the market of mass consumption and advertising. By 1905, clothing was increasingly factory made and often sold in large, fixed-price department stores, spurring a new age of consumerism with the rising middle class who benefited from the industrial revolution.

Women's fashions
During the Victorian Era, women generally worked in the private, domestic sphere. Unlike in earlier centuries when women would often help their husbands and brothers in family businesses and in labour, during the nineteenth century, gender roles became more defined. The requirement for farm labourers was no longer in such a high demand after the Industrial Revolution, and women were more likely to perform domestic work or, if married, give up work entirely. Dress reflected this new, increasingly sedentary lifestyle, and was not intended to be utilitarian.

Clothes were seen as an expression of women's place in society, hence were differentiated in terms of social class. Upper-class women, who did not need to work, often wore a tightly laced corset over a bodice or chemisette, and paired them with a skirt adorned with numerous embroideries and trims; over layers of petticoats. Middle-class women exhibited similar dress styles; however, the decorations were not as extravagant. The layering of these garments make them very heavy. Corsets were also stiff and restricted movement. Although the clothes were not comfortable, the type of fabrics and the numerous layers were worn as a symbol of wealth.

 Neck-line: Bertha is the low shoulder neck-line worn by women during the Victorian Era. The cut exposed a woman's shoulders and it sometimes was trimmed over with a three to six-inch deep lace flounce, or the bodice has neckline draped with several horizontal bands of fabric pleats. However, the exposure of neck-line was only restricted to the upper and middle class, working-class women during the time period were not allowed to reveal so much flesh.The décolleté style made shawls to become an essential feature of dresses. Corsets lost their shoulder straps, and fashion was to produce two bodices, one closed décolletage for day and one décolleté for evening.
 Boning: Corsets were used in women's gowns for emphasizing the small waist of the female body. They function as an undergarment which can be adjusted to bind tightly around the waist, hold and train a person's waistline, so to slim and conform it to a fashionable silhouette. It also helped stop the bodice from horizontal creasing. With the corset, a very small tight fitting waist would be shown.Corsets have been blamed for causing many diseases because of tight lacing, but the practice was less commonplace than generally thought today (Effects of tightlacing on the body).

 Sleeves: Sleeves were tightly fit during the early Victorian era. It matched with the tight fit women's small waist in the design, and the shoulder sleeve seamline was drooped more to show a tighter fit on the arm. This eventually limited women's movements with the sleeves.However, as crinolines started to develop in fashion, sleeves turned to be like large bells which gave the dress a heavier volume. Engageantes, which were usually made of lace, linen, or lawn, with cambric and broderie anglaise, were worn under the sleeves. They were easy to remove, launder and restitch into position, so to act as false sleeves, which was tacked to the elbow-length sleeves during the time. They commonly appear under the bell-shaped sleeves of day dresses.
 Silhouette: Silhouette changed over time supported by the evolution of the undergarment. In earlier days, wide skirts were supported by fabrics like linen which used horsehair in the weave. Crinolines were used to give skirts a beehive shape, with at least six layers petticoats worn under the skirt, which could weigh as much as fourteen pounds. Later, the cage crinoline was developed. Women were freed from the heavy petticoats, and were able to move their legs freely beneath the cage. Silhouette later began to emphasise a slope toward the back of the skirt. Polonaise style was introduced where fullness bunched up at the back of the skirt. Crinolines and cages also started to disappear with it being more dangerous to working-class women. Tournures or bustles were developed.

Victorian-era cosmetics were typically minimal, as makeup was associated with promiscuity. Many cosmetics contained toxic or caustic ingredients like lead, mercury, ammonia, and arsenic.

1830s dress style 

During the start of Queen Victoria's reign in 1837, the ideal shape of the Victorian woman was a long slim torso emphasised by wide hips. To achieve a low and slim waist, corsets were tightly laced and extended over the abdomen and down towards the hips. A chemise was commonly worn under the corset, and cut relatively low in order to prevent exposure. Over the corset, was the tight-fitting bodice featuring a low waistline. Along with the bodice was a long skirt, featuring layers of horsehair petticoats worn underneath to create fullness; while placing emphasis on the small waist. To contrast the narrow waist, low and straight necklines were thus used.

1840s dress style 

In the 1840s, collapsed sleeves, low necklines, elongated V-shaped bodices, and fuller skirts characterised the dress styles of women.

At the start of the decade, the sides of bodices stopped at the natural waistline, and met at a point in the front. In accordance with the heavily boned corset and seam lines on the bodice as well, the popular low and narrow waist was thus accentuated.

Sleeves of bodices were tight at the top, because of the Mancheron, but expanded around the area between the elbow and before the wrist. It was also initially placed below the shoulder, however; this restricted the movements of the arm.

As a result, the middle of the decade saw sleeves flaring out from the elbow into a funnel shape; requiring undersleeves to be worn in order to cover the lower arms.

Skirts lengthened, while widths increased due to the introduction of the horsehair crinoline in 1847; becoming a status symbol of wealth.

Extra layers of flounces and petticoats, also further emphasised the fullness of these wide skirts. In compliance with the narrow waist though, skirts were therefore attached to bodices using very tight organ pleats secured at each fold. This served as a decorative element for a relatively plain skirt. The 1840s style was perceived as conservative and "Gothic" compared to the flamboyance of the 1830s.

1850s dress style 

A similar silhouette remained in the 1850s, while certain elements of garments changed. Necklines of day dresses dropped even lower into a V-shape, causing a need to cover the bust area with a chemisette. In contrast, evening dresses featured a Bertha, which completely exposed the shoulder area instead. Bodices began to extend over the hips, while the sleeves opened further and increased in fullness. The volume and width of the skirt continued to increase, especially during 1853, when rows of flounces were added.

Nevertheless, in 1856, skirts expanded even further; creating a dome shape, due to the invention of the first artificial cage crinoline. The purpose of the crinoline was to create an artificial hourglass silhouette by accentuating the hips, and fashioning an illusion of a small waist; along with the corset. The cage crinoline was constructed by joining thin metal strips together to form a circular structure that could solely support the large width of the skirt. This was made possible by technology which allowed iron to be turned into steel, which could then be drawn into fine wires. Although often ridiculed by journalists and cartoonists of the time as the crinoline swelled in size, this innovation freed women from the heavy weight of petticoats and was a much more hygienic option.

Meanwhile, the invention of synthetic dyes added new colours to garments and women experimented with gaudy and bright colours. Technological innovation of 1860s provided women with freedom and choices.

1860s dress style 

During the early and middle 1860s, crinolines began decreasing in size at the top, while retaining their amplitude at the bottom. In contrast, the shape of the crinoline became flatter in the front and more voluminous behind, as it moved towards the back since skirts consisted of trains now. Bodices on the other hand, ended at the natural waistline, had wide pagoda sleeves, and included high necklines and collars for day dresses; low necklines for evening dresses. However, in 1868, the female silhouette had slimmed down as the crinoline was replaced by the bustle, and the supporting flounce overtook the role of determining the silhouette. Skirt widths diminished even further, while fullness and length remained at the back. In order to emphasise the back, the train was gathered together to form soft folds and draperies

1870s dress style 

The trend for broad skirts slowly disappeared during the 1870s, as women started to prefer an even slimmer silhouette. Bodices remained at the natural waistline, necklines varied, while sleeves began under the shoulder line. An overskirt was commonly worn over the bodice, and secured into a large bow behind. Over time though, the overskirt shortened into a detached basque, resulting in an elongation of the bodice over the hips. As the bodices grew longer in 1873, the polonaise was thus introduced into the Victorian dress styles. A polonaise is a garment featuring both an overskirt and bodice together. The tournure was also introduced, and along with the polonaise, it created an illusion of an exaggerated rear end.

By 1874, skirts began to taper in the front and were adorned with trimmings, while sleeves tightened around the wrist area. Towards 1875 to 1876, bodices featured long but even tighter laced waists, and converged at a sharp point in front. Bustles lengthened and slipped even lower, causing the fullness of the skirt to further diminish. Extra fabric was gathered together behind in pleats, thus creating a narrower but longer tiered, draped train too. Due to the longer trains, petticoats had to be worn underneath in order to keep the dress clean.

However, when 1877 approached, dresses moulded to fit the figure, as increasing slimmer silhouettes were favoured. This was allowed by the invention of the cuirass bodice which functions like a corset, but extends downwards to the hips and upper thighs. Although dress styles took on a more natural form, the narrowness of the skirt limited the wearer in regards to walking.

1880s dress style 

The early 1880s was a period of stylistic confusion. On one hand, there is the over-ornamented silhouette with contrasting texture and frivolous accessories. On the other hand, the growing popularity of tailoring gave rise to an alternative, severe style. Some credited the change in silhouette to the Victorian dress reform, which consisted of a few movements including the Aesthetic Costume Movement and the Rational Dress Movement in the mid-to-late Victorian Era advocating natural silhouette, lightweight underwear, and rejecting tightlacing. However, these movements did not gain widespread support. Others noted the growth in cycling and tennis as acceptable feminine pursuits that demanded a greater ease of movement in women's clothing. Still others argued that the growing popularity of tailored semi-masculine suits was simply a fashionable style, and indicated neither advanced views nor the need for practical clothes. Nonetheless, the diversification in options and adoption of what was considered menswear at that time coincided with growing power and social status of women towards the late-Victorian period.

The bustle made a re-appearance in 1883, and it featured a further exaggerated horizontal protrusion at the back. Due to the additional fullness, drapery moved towards the sides or front panel of the skirt instead. Any drapery at the back was lifted up into poufs. Bodices on the other hand, shortened and ended above the hips. Yet the style remained tailored, but was more structured.

However, by 1886, the silhouette transformed back to a slimmer figure again. Sleeves of bodices were thinner and tighter, while necklines became higher again. Furthermore, an even further tailored-look began to develop until it improved in the 1890s.

1890s dress style 
By 1890, the crinoline and bustle was fully abandoned, and skirts flared away naturally from the wearer's tiny waist. It evolved into a bell shape, and were made to fit tighter around the hip area. Necklines were high, while sleeves of bodices initially peaked at the shoulders, but increased in size during 1894. Although the large sleeves required cushions to secure them in place, it narrowed down towards the end of the decade. Women thus adopted the style of the tailored jacket, which improved their posture and confidence, while reflecting the standards of early female liberation.

Hats

Hats were crucial to a respectable appearance for both men and women. To go bareheaded was simply not proper. The top hat, for example, was standard formal wear for upper- and middle-class men. For women, the styles of hats changed over time and were designed to match their outfits.

During the early Victorian decades, voluminous skirts held up with crinolines, and then hoop skirts, were the focal point of the silhouette. To enhance the style without distracting from it, hats were modest in size and design, straw and fabric bonnets being the popular choice. Poke bonnets, which had been worn during the late Regency period, had high, small crowns and brims that grew larger until the 1830s, when the face of a woman wearing a poke bonnet could only be seen directly from the front. They had rounded brims, echoing the rounded form of the bell-shaped hoop skirts.

The silhouette changed once again as the Victorian era drew to a close. The shape was essentially an inverted triangle, with a wide-brimmed hat on top, a full upper body with puffed sleeves, no bustle, and a skirt that narrowed at the ankles (the hobble skirt was a fad shortly after the end of the Victorian era). The enormous wide-brimmed hats were covered with elaborate creations of silk flowers, ribbons, and above all, exotic plumes; hats sometimes included entire exotic birds that had been stuffed. Many of these plumes came from birds in the Florida everglades, which were nearly made entirely extinct by overhunting. By 1899, early environmentalists like Adeline Knapp were engaged in efforts to curtail the hunting for plumes. By 1900, more than five million birds a year were being slaughtered, and nearly 95 percent of Florida's shore birds had been killed by plume hunters.

Shoes 
The women's shoes of the early Victorian period were narrow and heelless, in black or white satin. By 1850s and 1860s, they were slightly broader with a low heel and made of leather or cloth. Ankle-length laced or buttoned boots were also popular. From the 1870s to the twentieth century, heels grew higher and toes more pointed. Low-cut pumps were worn for the evening.

Men's fashion 

During the 1840s, men wore tight-fitting, calf length frock coats and a waistcoat or vest. The vests were single- or double-breasted, with shawl or notched collars, and might be finished in double points at the lowered waist. For more formal occasions, a cutaway morning coat was worn with light trousers during the daytime, and a dark tail coat and trousers was worn in the evening. Shirts were made of linen or cotton with low collars, occasionally turned down, and were worn with wide cravats or neck ties. Trousers had fly fronts, and breeches were used for formal functions and when horseback riding. Men wore top hats, with wide brims in sunny weather.

During the 1850s, men started wearing shirts with high upstanding or turnover collars and four-in-hand neckties tied in a bow, or tied in a knot with the pointed ends sticking out like "wings". The upper-class continued to wear top hats, and bowler hats were worn by the working class.

In the 1860s, men started wearing wider neckties that were tied in a bow or looped into a loose knot and fastened with a stickpin. Frock coats were shortened to knee-length and were worn for business, while the mid-thigh length sack coat slowly displaced the frock coat for less-formal occasions. Top hats briefly became the very tall "stovepipe" shape, but a variety of other hat shapes were popular.

During the 1870s, three-piece suits grew in popularity along with patterned fabrics for shirts. Neckties were the four-in-hand and, later, the Ascot ties. A narrow ribbon tie was an alternative for tropical climates, especially in the Americas. Both frock coats and sack coats became shorter. Flat straw boaters were worn when boating.

During the 1880s, formal evening dress remained a dark tail coat and trousers with a dark waistcoat, a white bow tie, and a shirt with a winged collar. In mid-decade, the dinner jacket or tuxedo, was used in more relaxed formal occasions. The Norfolk jacket and tweed or woolen breeches were used for rugged outdoor pursuits such as shooting. Knee-length topcoats, often with contrasting velvet or fur collars, and calf-length overcoats were worn in winter. Men's shoes had higher heels and a narrow toe.

Starting from the 1890s, the blazer was introduced, and was worn for sports, sailing, and other casual activities.

Throughout much of the Victorian era most men wore fairly short hair.  This was often accompanied by various forms of facial hair including moustaches, side-burns, and full beards.  A clean-shaven face did not come back into fashion until the end of the 1880s and early 1890s.

Distinguishing what men really wore from what was marketed to them in periodicals and advertisements is problematic, as reliable records do not exist.

Mourning black

In Britain, black is the colour traditionally associated with mourning for the dead. The customs and etiquette expected of men, and especially women, were rigid during much of the Victorian era. The expectations depended on a complex hierarchy of close or distant relationship with the deceased. The closer the relationship, the longer the mourning period and the wearing of black. The wearing of full black was known as First Mourning, which had its own expected attire, including fabrics, and an expected duration of 4 to 18 months. Following the initial period of First Mourning, the mourner would progress to Second Mourning, a transition period of wearing less black, which was followed by Ordinary Mourning, and then Half-mourning. Some of these stages of mourning were shortened or skipped completely if the mourner's relationship to the deceased was more distant. Half-mourning was a transition period when black was replaced by acceptable colours such as lavender and mauve, possibly considered acceptable transition colours because of the tradition of Church of England (and Catholic) clergy wearing lavender or mauve stoles for funeral services, to represent the Passion of Christ.

The mourning dress on the right was worn by Queen Victoria, "it shows the traditional touches of mourning attire, which she wore from the death of her husband, Prince Albert (1819–1861), until her own death."

Norms for mourning

Manners and Rules of Good Society, or, Solecisms to be Avoided (London, Frederick Warne & Co., 1887) gives clear instructions, such as the following:

The complexity of these etiquette rules extends to specific mourning periods and attire for siblings, step-parents, aunts and uncles distinguished by blood and by marriage, nieces, nephews, first and second cousins, children, infants, and "connections" (who were entitled to ordinary mourning for a period of "1–3 weeks, depending on level of intimacy"). Men were expected to wear mourning black to a lesser extent than women, and for a shorter mourning period. After the mid-19th century, men would wear a black hatband and black suit, but for only half the prescribed period of mourning expected of women. Widowers were expected to mourn for a mere three months, whereas the proper mourning period expected for widows was up to four years. Women who mourned in black for longer periods were accorded great respect in public for their devotion to the departed, the most prominent example being Queen Victoria herself.

Women with lesser financial means tried to keep up with the example being set by the middle and upper classes by dyeing their daily dress. Dyers made most of their income during the Victorian period by dyeing clothes black for mourning.

Technological advancement 
Technological advancements not only influenced the economy but brought a major change in the fashion styles worn by men and women. As the Victorian era was based on the principles of gender, race and class. Much advancement was in favor of the upper class as they were the ones who could afford the latest technology and change their fashion styles accordingly.  In 1830s there was introduction of horse hair crinoline that became a symbol of status and wealth as only the upper-class women could wear it.  In 1850s there were more fashion technological advancements hence 1850s could rightly be called a revolution in the Victorian fashion industry such as the innovation of artificial cage crinoline that gave women an artificial hourglass silhouette this meant that women did not have to wear layers of petticoats anymore to achieve illusion of wide hips and it was also hygienic. Synthetic dyes were also introduced that added new bright colours to garments. These technological advancement gave women freedom and choices. In 1855's Haute couture was introduced as tailoring became more mainstream in years to follow.

Charles Frederick Worth, a prominent English designer, became popular amongst the upper class though its city of destiny always is Paris. Haute couture became popular at the same time when sewing machines were invented. Hand sewn techniques arose and were a distinction in compared to the old ways of tailoring. Princess Eugenie of France wore the Englishman dressmaker, Charles Frederick Worth's couture and he instantly became famous in France though he had just arrived in Paris a few years ago. In 1855, Queen Victoria and Prince Albert of Britain welcomed Napoleon III and Eugenie of France to a full state visit to England. Eugenie was considered a fashion icon in France. She and Queen Victoria became instant friends. Queen Victoria, who had been the fashion icon for European high fashion, was inspired by Eugenie's style and the fashions she wore. Later Queen Victoria also appointed Charles Frederick Worth as her dress maker and he became a prominent designer amongst the European upper class. Charles Frederick Worth is known as the father of the haute couture as later the concept of labels were also invented in the late 19th century as custom, made to fit tailoring became mainstream.

By the 1860s, when Europe was all about made-to-fit tailoring, crinolines were considered impractical. In the 1870s, women preferred more slimmer silhouettes, hence bodices grew longer and the polonaise, a skirt and bodice made together, was introduced. In 1870s the Cuirass Bodice, a piece of armour that covers the torso and functions like a corset, was invented. Towards the end of Victoria's reign, dresses were flared naturally as crinolines were rejected by middle-class women. Designers such as Charles Frederick Worth were also against them. All these inventions and changes in fashion led to women's liberation as tailored looks improved posture and were more practical.

Home decor 

Home decor started spare, veered into the elaborately draped and decorated style we today regard as Victorian, then embraced the retro-chic of William Morris as well as pseudo-Japonaiserie.

Contemporary stereotypes

Modesty 

Many myths and exaggerations about the period persist to the modern day. Examples include the idea of men's clothing is seen as formal and stiff, women's as elaborate and over-done; clothing covered the entire body, and even the glimpse of an ankle was scandalous. Critics contend that corsets constricted women's bodies and women's lives. Homes are described as gloomy, dark, cluttered with massive and over-ornate furniture and proliferating bric-a-brac. Myth has it that even piano legs were scandalous, and covered with tiny pantalettes.

In truth, men's formal clothing may have been less colourful than it was in the previous century, but brilliant waistcoats and cummerbunds provided a touch of color, and smoking jackets and dressing gowns were often of rich Oriental brocades. This phenomenon was the result of the growing textile manufacturing sector, developing mass production processes, and increasing attempts to market fashion to men. Corsets stressed a woman's sexuality, exaggerating hips and bust by contrast with a tiny waist. Women's evening gowns bared the shoulders and the tops of the breasts. The jersey dresses of the 1880s may have covered the body, but the stretchy novel fabric fit the body like a glove.

Home furnishing was not necessarily ornate or overstuffed. However, those who could afford lavish draperies and expensive ornaments, and wanted to display their wealth, would often do so. Since the Victorian era was one of increased social mobility, there were ever more nouveaux riches making a rich show.

The items used in decoration may also have been darker and heavier than those used today, simply as a matter of practicality. London was noisy and its air was full of soot from countless coal fires. Hence those who could afford it draped their windows in heavy, sound-muffling curtains, and chose colours that didn't show soot quickly. When all washing was done by hand, curtains were not washed as frequently as they might be today.

There is no actual evidence that piano legs were considered scandalous. Pianos and tables were often draped with shawls or cloths—but if the shawls hid anything, it was the cheapness of the furniture. There are references to lower-middle-class families covering up their pine tables rather than show that they couldn't afford mahogany. The piano leg story seems to have originated in the 1839 book, A Diary in America written by Captain Frederick Marryat, as a satirical comment on American prissiness.

Victorian manners may have been as strict as imagined—on the surface. One simply did not speak publicly about sex, childbirth, and such matters, at least in the respectable middle and upper classes. However, as is well known, discretion covered a multitude of sins. Prostitution flourished. Upper-class men and women indulged in adulterous liaisons.

Gallery

See also 
 Victorian dress reform
 Women in the Victorian Era
 Victorian morality
 Charles Frederick Worth
 Victorian decorative arts
 Victoriana

Time periods 
 1830s in fashion
 1840s in fashion
 1850s in fashion
 1860s in fashion
 1870s in fashion
 1880s in fashion
 1890s in fashion

Women's clothing 
 Corset
 Corset controversy
 Tightlacing
 Bloomers
 Bodice

Contemporary interpretations 
 Steampunk
 Neo-Victorian
 Lolita

References

Further reading 

 Sweet, Matthew – Inventing the Victorians, St. Martin's Press, 2001

External links 
 Victorian Fashion
 VictorianVoices.net – Fashion articles and illustrations from Victorian periodicals; extensive fashion image gallery
 Victorian myths
 Victorian fashion, etiquette, and sports
 Background on "A Diary in America"
 Form and Fashion —  the evolution of women's dress during the 19th century (many photographs)
 Educational Game: Mix and Match — build a 19th-century dress using a virtual mannequin
 
Fashion detective: Fashion, Fiction and Forensics in nineteenth century Australian fashion on Culture Victoria

 

1900s fashion
History of clothing (Western fashion)
19th century in the arts